"Moral of the Story" is a song by American singer Ashe, featured on her second EP Moral of the Story: Chapter 1 (2019) and her debut studio album Ashlyn (2021). The song gained popularity after it was featured in the Netflix teen rom-com film To All the Boys: P.S. I Still Love You (2020). The song is co-written and co-produced by American producer Noah Conrad and Finneas O'Connell. The song reached number 71 on the Billboard Hot 100, becoming Ashe's first Hot 100 entry among many other countries including United Kingdom, Ireland, France, Canada, Netherlands and New Zealand.

Background and commercial performance 
"Moral of the Story" was originally released on Valentine's Day 2019 ahead of the release of Ashe's second EP, Moral of the Story: Chapter 1 (2019). The song was co-written and co-produced by five-time Grammy-winner Finneas O'Connell, and also features an uncredited lyrical contribution from his sister, Billie Eilish. The song made its world radio airplay premiere on KYSR on 21 February 2020. The song also became popular on the video-sharing platform TikTok, where it has been used in over 900 thousand videos as of June 2020.

By the time the song had debuted at number 71 on the Billboard Hot 100, it had gained 9.7 million US streams and 4 thousand downloads. As a result of the song's success, Ashe debuted at number six on the Billboard Emerging Artists chart.

Composition and lyrics 
In terms of music notation, "Moral of the Story" was composed using  common time in the key of B-flat major with a moderate tempo of 120 beats per minute. Ashe's vocal range spans from the low note F3 to the high note of G5, giving the song two octaves and one note of range.

In 2018, Ashe wrote "Moral of the Story" after filing for divorce, in an attempt to try and make sense of why the relationship failed. She told Earmilk:

Critical reception 
"Moral of the Story" was described by Gregory Castel of Earmilk as a "sobering love ballad with attention-grabbing lyrics" which Ashe has written with "captivating satire and vulnerability".

Music video 
The song's music video, which has gained over 36 million views on YouTube, was released with the single and was noted to have a Walter Wick-inspired aesthetic.

Charts

Weekly charts

Year-end charts

Certifications

Niall Horan version 

A version of the song featuring vocals from Irish singer Niall Horan was released on June 17, 2020. It was included on Ashe's debut studio album Ashlyn (2021).

Charts

References 

Songs about divorce
2010s ballads
2019 singles
2020 singles
2019 songs
Niall Horan songs
Satirical songs
Song recordings produced by Finneas O'Connell
Songs written by Finneas O'Connell
Songs written by Niall Horan